Mambrillas de Lara is a municipality and town located in the province of Burgos, Castile and León, Spain. According to the 2004 census (INE), the municipality has a population of 69 inhabitants.

People from Mambrillas de Lara 
Lorenzo Juarros García, "Loren" (1966) - Retired professional footballer

References 

Municipalities in the Province of Burgos